Nenad Mitrović may refer to:

Nenad Mitrović (footballer, born 1980), Serbian footballer
Nenad Mitrović (footballer, born 1998), Serbian football goalkeeper
Nenad Mitrović, Yugoslav musician, former guitarist of Rock group Osmi putnik
Nenad Mitrović (Serbian Progressive Party politician) (born 1973)
Nenad Mitrović (Democratic Party politician) (born 1970)